Kuropatino is a rural locality (a selo) and the administrative center of Kuropatinsky Selsoviet of Tambovsky District, Amur Oblast, Russia. The population was 482 as of 2018. There are only 5 streets in the village.

Geography 
Kuropatino is located 35 km southwest of Tambovka (the district's administrative centre) by road. Nikolayevka is the nearest rural locality.

References 

Rural localities in Tambovsky District, Amur Oblast